Dog Eat Dog Films is film director Michael Moore's production company. Dog Eat Dog Films has produced films, television programs, and DVDs. Moore founded Dog Eat Dog Films in 1989.

Filmography
 Roger & Me (1989) 
 Pets or Meat: The Return to Flint (1992) 
 TV Nation (1994) (TV series)
 Canadian Bacon (1995)
 The Big One (1997)
 The Awful Truth (1999) (TV series)
 Bowling for Columbine (2002)
 Fahrenheit 9/11 (2004)
 Sicko (2007)
 Captain Mike Across America (2007)
 Capitalism: A Love Story (2009)
 Where to Invade Next (2015)
 Michael Moore in TrumpLand (2016)
 Fahrenheit 11/9 (2018)

References

External links
 Dog Eat Dog Films website

Michael Moore
Film production companies of the United States
Mass media companies established in 1989